Roger la Honte is a 1922 French silent historical film directed by Jacques de Baroncelli and starring Rita Jolivet, Gabriel Signoret and Maggy Théry. It is an adaption of the novel of the same title by Jules Mary.

Cast
 Rita Jolivet as Julia de Noirville  
 Gabriel Signoret as Roger Laroque  
 Maggy Théry as Suzanne Laroque 
 Eric Barclay as Roger de Noirville  
 Sylvie (actress) as Henriette Laroque  
 Régine Dumien as Suzanne, enfant  
 Roger Monteaux as L. de Noirville 
 Roger Pineau as Roger de Noirville, enfant  
 André Marnay as Luversan  
 Paul Jorge as Le caissier 
 Thomy Bourdelle
 Henri Chomette   
 Mangin   
 Noémi Seize

References

Bibliography
 Goble, Alan. The Complete Index to Literary Sources in Film. Walter de Gruyter, 1999.

External links 
 

1922 films
1920s historical drama films
French historical drama films
French silent films
1920s French-language films
Films directed by Jacques de Baroncelli
Films based on French novels
Films set in the 19th century
French black-and-white films
1922 drama films
Silent historical drama films
1920s French films